Fantasia is a side-scrolling video game developed by Infogrames and produced by Sega for its own Mega Drive/Genesis system. The game was loosely based on the film of the same name.

Plot

Gameplay
The player controls Mickey Mouse as the Sorcerer's Apprentice through various side-scrolling levels in an attempt to collect musical notes that went missing whilst he was asleep. The game's four levels were based on amalgamations of the segments of Fantasia, with each one themed around the elements: water (The Sorcerer's Apprentice, Dance of the Reed Flutes and Nutcracker Arabian Dance), earth (The Rite of Spring), air (Trepak, Pastoral Symphony and Dance of the Hours) and fire (Night on Bald Mountain, Toccata and Fugue in D Minor). The player defeats various enemies by jumping on them or by collecting magical bubbles that could be used to shoot at enemies as projectiles. In each level, the player collects a certain number of hidden magical notes in order for the song to play once again.

Development
Sega was inspired by the success of Castle of Illusion and by the 50th Anniversary of the 1940 film to create the game. Development began in January 1990. The Sega producer Scott Berfield along with Stephan L. Butler monitored Infogrames development of the game to ensure it remained a faithful adaptation. The development team consisted of six people who lacked experience in developing console games.

With pressure from holiday rush and the summer release of Sonic the Hedgehog, time to develop the game was tight. It was difficult to replicate the animation and music quality of the film to the 16-bit console. By May, Sega presented Fantasia at the Consumer Electronics Show and by mid-summer was showcased at the Tec Toy launch.

With no time to tweak the gameplay or polish the graphics, the game was shipped in time for the holiday season. The release of Fantasia was met with complaints by Roy E. Disney who had made a promise to his uncle Walt, that Fantasia adaptions would not be made. The licensing turned out to be granted in error. Sales of the game were to stop, every unsold copy (5,000 approximately) was to be destroyed and every advertisement about the game was to be removed.

Reception

The game was poorly received, with MegaTech magazine saying the game was "a massive disappointment. Poorly designed, bland and frustrating, with very little appeal". Mean Machines said that although appearing impressive at first with "excellent sprites and gorgeous backdrops, the gameplay is badly flawed and there are several highly annoying features that make the action frustrating". Mega Play’s four reviewers gave average to below average review, they unanimously praised the graphics and animations but also criticized the gameplay calling it choppy, substandard and awkward. Mega Action gave Fantasia an overall score of 80% and praised the cartoon-like animation and criticized the games difficulty set far too high. Console XS initially praised the graphics as "astounding" and the animation and scrolling as "superb". They criticized the game saying: "This game is full of poor collision detection, frustrating restart points and repetitive gameplay. Very, very tough". The four reviewers of Electronic Gaming Monthly gave average reviews praising the graphics, animation and game music.  They criticized the game’s controls and gameplay calling it repetitive, clunky and unpredictable and said that Fantasia does not measure up to Castle of Illusion.

Mega placed the game at #6 in their list of the 10 Worst Mega Drive Games of All Time.

See also
List of Disney video games

References

External links

Video game
1991 video games
Dinosaurs in video games
Fantasy video games
Mickey Mouse video games
Infogrames games
Platform games
Single-player video games
Sega Genesis games
Sega Genesis-only games
Side-scrolling video games
Video games based on films
Video games developed in France
Video games set in prehistory
Works based on The Sorcerer's Apprentice